Executive Order 10555, signed by President Dwight D. Eisenhower on August 23, 1954, established a Seal for the President's Committee on Employment of the Physically Handicapped.

The Committee was succeeded by the President's Committee on Employment of People with Disabilities, which in turn was made into the Office of Disability Employment Policy, an agency in the Department of Labor, in 2001.

See also
Executive order (United States)

References

External links

 Text of Executive Order No. 10555
 Executive Order 10555 from the U.S. National Archives and Records Administration website.

1965 in American law
History of civil rights in the United States
History of affirmative action in the United States
Executive orders of Dwight D. Eisenhower
Disability in the United States